The Battle of Mantinea was fought in 207 BC between Sparta under the Tyrant Machanidas, as part of the Aetolian League, and the Achaean League whose forces were led by Philopoemen. Both sides were supplemented by mercenaries. It was the major land battle in Greece of the First Macedonian War, which had occurred due to Macedonian alliance with Carthage in the aftermath of Hannibal's victory at the Battle of Cannae in the Second Punic War.

Machanidas routed and chased from the field the mercenaries of Philopoemen. They pursued, however, too eagerly and when Machanidas led his men back to the battle the outnumbered Spartan infantry had been defeated and the Achaeans were strongly positioned behind a water filled ditch. Going back on to the attack Machanidas was dismounted as he attempted to leap  his horse over the ditch and was slain. The Achaeans, allies of Macedonia, were victorious.

References

207 BC
Mantinea 207 BC
Mantinea
Mantinea (207 BC)